Bare-knuckle boxing (or simply bare-knuckle) is a full-contact combat sport based on punching without any form of padding on the hands.

The difference between street fighting and a bare-knuckle boxing match is that the latter has an accepted set of rules, such as not striking a downed opponent. The rules that provided the foundation for bare-knuckle boxing for much of the 18th and 19th centuries were the London Prize Ring Rules.

By the late 19th century, professional boxing moved from bare-knuckle to using boxing gloves. The last major world heavyweight championship happened in 1889 and was held by John L. Sullivan. The American National Police Gazette magazine was recognized as sanctioning the world championship titles.

Bare-knuckle boxing has seen a resurgence in the 21st century with the English promotion BKB (Bare Knuckle Boxing) along with other UK promotions such as Warrington’s UBKB (Ultimate Bare Knuckle Boxing) and Bare Fist Boxing Association (BFBA) & American promotion Bare Knuckle Fighting Championship (BKFC) and BYB Extreme (BYB) based out of Miami Florida.

In September 2022 it was announced that Bare Knuckle Fighting Championship had acquired the UK organisation Bare Fist Boxing Association (BFBA) to form Bare Knuckle Fighting Championship UK (BKFC UK). The move meant that BKFC would now regularly hold shows throughout the United Kingdom.

Early history
The sport as it is known today originated in England. According to the boxing chronicle Pugilistica, the first newspaper report of a boxing match in England dates from 1681, when the Protestant Mercury stated: "Yesterday a match of boxing was performed before his Grace the Duke of Albemarle, between the Duke's footman and a butcher. The latter won the prize, as he hath done many before, being accounted, though but a little man, the best at that exercise in England."
 
The first bare-knuckle champion of England was James Figg, who claimed the title in 1719 and held it until his retirement in 1730. Before Jack Broughton, the first idea of current boxing originated from James Figg, who is viewed as the organizer of cutting edge boxing. In 1719, he set up a 'pugilistic foundation' and charged himself as 'a professional in the Noble Science of Defense' to instruct boxers on the utilization of clench hands, sword, and quarterstaff. Noted champions were Jack Broughton, Elizabeth Wilkinson, Daniel Mendoza, Jem Belcher, Hen Pearce, John Gully, Tom Cribb, Tom Spring, Jem Ward, James Burke, William "Bendigo" Thompson, Ben Caunt, William Perry, Tom Sayers and Jem Mace.

The record for the longest bare-knuckle fight is listed as 6 hours and 15 minutes for a match between James Kelly and Jonathan Smith, fought near Fiery Creek, Victoria, Australia, on December 3, 1855, when Smith gave in after 17 rounds.

The bare-knuckle fighter Jem Mace is listed as having the longest professional career of any fighter in history. He fought for more than 35 years into his 60s, and recorded his last exhibition bout in 1909 at the age of 78.

Professional bare-knuckle boxing was never legal under any federal or state laws in the United States until Wyoming became the first to legalize on March 20, 2018. Prior to that date, the chief sanctioning organization for bare-knuckle boxing was the magazine National Police Gazette, which set up matches and issued championship belts throughout the 1880s. The Police Gazette sanctioned what is considered the last major bare-knuckle heavyweight world championship, between John L. Sullivan and Jake Kilrain on July 8, 1889, with Sullivan emerging as the victor.

Other noted champions were Tom Hyer, Yankee Sullivan, Nonpareil Dempsey, Tom Sharkey, Bob Fitzsimmons and John Morrissey.

Rules
Classical Pugilism began to adopt rules by the mid 1700s to decrease cases of injuries and death, while also showcasing the sport as a respectable athletic endeavor. There were three rules that were adopted during that time until the acceptance of modern gloved boxing.
 Broughton Rules: The first set of rules devised by champion Jack Broughton in 1743. Under Broughton’s rules, a round continued until a man went down; after 30 seconds he had to face his opponent (square off), standing no more than a yard (about a metre) away, or be declared beaten. Hitting a downed opponent was also forbidden.
 London Prize Ring Rules: A new set of rules initiated by the British Pugilists’ Protective Association in 1838 and further revised in 1853. The new rules provided for a ring 24 feet (7.32 metres) square bounded by two ropes. When a fighter went down, the round ended, and he was helped to his corner. The next round would begin 30 seconds later, with each boxer required to reach, unaided, a mark in the centre of the ring. If a fighter could not reach that mark by the end of 8 additional seconds, he was declared the loser. Kicking, gouging, butting with the head, biting, and low blows were all declared fouls.
 Marquess of Queensberry Rules: Another set of rules that was codified by John Graham Chambers of the Amateur Athletic Club and patronized by John Sholto Douglas, the 9th marquess of Queensberry, in 1867. The new rules added restrictions that continued in boxing to the modern day, such as fighters having to wear padded gloves, a round being consisted of three minutes of fighting followed by a minute of rest, wrestling becoming illegal, and any fighter who went down had to get up unaided within 10 seconds. If a fighter was unable to get up, he was declared knocked out, and the fight was over. During this period the introduction of the first weight divisions also took place.

Techniques
Early fighting had no written rules. There were no weight divisions or round limits and no referee, resulting in very chaotic fights. An early account of boxing was published in Nottingham, 1713, by Sir Thomas Parkyns, 2nd Baronet, a landowner in Bunny, Nottinghamshire, who had practised the techniques he described. The article, a single page in his manual of wrestling and fencing, Progymnasmata: The inn-play, or Cornish-hugg wrestler, described a system of headbutting, punching, eye-gouging, chokes, and hard throws, not recognized in boxing today. Consequently, there were no round limits to fights. When a man could not come to scratch, he would be declared loser and the fight would be brought to a halt. Fights could also end if broken up beforehand by crowd riot, police interference or chicanery, or if both men were willing to accept that the contest was a draw. While fights could have enormous numbers of rounds, the rounds in practice could be quite short with fighters pretending to go down from minor blows to take advantage of the 30-second rest period.

Even though Broughton's era brought rules to make boxing more civilized, there were still many moves in this era that are illegal in today's gloved boxing. That being said, there were also new revolutionary techniques that were formulated during this time. Grappling was allowed and many favored the use of cross-buttocks throw and suplexes, although grabs below the waist were illegal. Clinching, known as chancery, were also legal and in-use. Fibbing, where a boxer grabs hold of an opponent by the neck or hair and pummel him multiple times, were allowed. The traditional bare-knuckle boxing stance was actually designed to combat against the use of grappling as well as block punching. Kicking was also allowed in boxing at that time, with William "Bendigo" Thompson being an expert in kicks during his fight with Ben Caunt, and the Lancanshire Navigator using purring kicks in his battle with Tom Cribb.

It was during classical pugilism where many famous boxing techniques were invented. Samuel Elias was the first to invent a punch that would later become known as the uppercut. Tom Spring popularized the use of the left hook and created a technique called the "Harlequin Step" where he would put himself just within reach of his opponent, then avoiding the instinctive punch while simultaneously delivering one himself, basically inventing the boxing feint. Daniel Mendoza would become the inventor of the outboxer-style of boxing.

Irish stand down

"Irish stand down" is a type of traditional bare knuckle fighting where the aspect of maneuvering around the ring is removed, leaving only the less nuanced aspects of punching and "taking" punches. This form of combat was popular in Irish American ghettos in the United States in the late 19th century but was eclipsed in the Irish American community first by bare knuckle boxing and then later by regulation boxing. The Irish stand down is also known as strap fighting or toe to toe.

Modern bare-knuckle boxing
Bareknuckle boxing returned, legally, to the United Kingdom after more than a century in Kettering, Northamptonshire, on June 29, 2015. The show was promoted by UBBAD, headed by Joe Smith-Brown and Jim Freeman. Smith-Brown and Freeman discovered that, by law, fighters would have to wear hand wraps in order to compete in bareknuckle contests legally.  

With the resurgence of bare-knuckle boxing in the 21st century, several modifications have been made to classical rules that controlled historical bare-knuckle boxing. Additionally, there are several changes from the Marquess of Queensberry Rules. Most notably, there is an 18-second count on any knockdown in the BKB, although the BKFC uses the traditional 10-count. In most modern bare-knuckle promotions, there is no three-knockdown rule and fighters cannot be saved by the bell. Fights consists of 5 rounds of 2 minutes in BKFC and 7 rounds of 2 minutes in BKB. One of the distinguishing characteristics of modern bare-knuckle boxing is the inclusion of punching in the clinch, also known as "dirty boxing". In BKB, the rules are essentially those of gloved boxing but with the absence of gloves.

On the 26th February 2022 Mathilda Wilson of Sweden took on Taylor Reeves of England, who had stepped in as a late replacement, in the first legally sanctioned female bare knuckle bout to take place in the UK in the modern era. The bout was held in Wolverhampton and was sanctioned and governed by the International Sport Kick-boxing Association ISKA Mathilda Wilson was victorious winning by TKO in the first round and in the process became the first ever Scandinavian women to compete professionally in bare knuckle.

Bare Knuckle Fighting Championship Rules 
1. Fighters are permitted to wrap and tape the wrist, thumb, and mid-hand. No gauze or tape can be within  of the knuckles.

2. Fighters will “toe the line”. The front foot will be on the line, and the referee will instruct the fighters to “knuckle up”, which indicates the beginning of the bout/round.

3. Punches are the only strike allowed and must be with a closed fist (no kicks, elbows, knees or grappling).

4. In the clinch, the fighter may punch his way out with the open hand. If there is a three-second lull in action while clinching, the referee will break the fighters.

5. A fighter who is knocked down will have 10 seconds to return to his feet, or the referee will stop the fight. It is not permitted to hit a downed fighter. Any fighter who does will be disqualified, and the purse will be withheld. While a fighter is downed, the other fighter will be instructed to report to a neutral space.

6. If a fighter is cut and the blood is impairing a fighter’s vision, the referee may call a timeout to give the cutman 30 seconds to stop the bleeding. If the blood cannot be controlled and the blood inhibits the fighter’s vision, the referee will stop the fight and award victory to the other fighter.

7. Fights are two minutes per round and each bout will be 3 or 5  rounds in length. In BKB can be 3, 5 or 7.

8. Attire: All fighters must have a groin protector with a cup, a mouthpiece, trunks or boxing trunks, and boxing/wrestling shoes. 

9. All fighters are expected to give 100% effort and behave with complete sportsmanship.

Current titleholders

Police Gazette

Bare Knuckle Boxing (BKB™)

BYB Extreme (BYB)

Bare Knuckle Fighting Championship (BKFC)

Bare Knuckle Fighting Championship UK (BKFC UK)

List of English Heavyweight Bare-Knuckle Boxing Champions 

 James Figg 1719-1730
 Tom Pipes 1730-1734
 George Taylor (boxer) 1734-1736
 Jack Broughton 1736-1750
 Jack Slack (boxer) 1750-1760
 William Stevens (boxer) 1760-1761
 George Meggs 1761-1762
 Tom Juchau 1765-1766
 William Darts 1766-1769
 Tom Lyons (boxer) 1769
 Willam Darts 1769-1771
 Peter Corcoran 1771-1776
 Harry Sellers 1776-1779
 Duggan Fearns 1779
 Tom Johnson 1787-1791
 Benjamin Brain 1791-1794
 Daniel Mendoza 1794-1795
 John Jackson 1795-1796
 Thomas Owen 1796-1797
 Jack Bartholomew 1797-1800
 Jem Belcher 1800-1805
 Hen Pearce 1805-1807
 John Gully 1807-1808
 Tom Cribb 1808-1822
 Tom Spring 1823-1824
 Tom Cannon 1824-1825
 Jem Ward 1825-1827
 Peter Crawley (boxer) 1827
 Jem Ward 1827-1832
 James Burke (boxer) 1833-1839
 William Thompson (boxer) 1839-1840
 Ben Caunt 1840-1841
 Nick Ward (boxer) 1841
 Ben Caunt1841-1845
 William Thompson (boxer) 1845-1850
 William Perry (boxer)1850-1851
 Harry Broome 1851-1856
 Tom Paddock 1856-1858
 Tom Sayers 1858-1860
 Sam Hurst 1860- 1861
 Jem Mace 1861-1862
 Tom King (boxer) 1862-1863
 Joe Wormald 1865
 Jem Mace 1866-1871

List of United States Heavyweight Bare-knuckle Boxing Champions 

 Tom Molineaux 1810-1815
 Tom Hyer 1841-1851
 John Morrissey 1853-1859
 John Camel Heenan 1860-1863
 Joe Coburn 1863-1865
 Jimmy Elliott 1865-1870
 Mike McCoole 1870
 Tom Allen (boxer) 1870
 Jem Mace 1870-1871
 Tom Allen (boxer) 1873-1876
 Joe Goss 1876-1880
 Paddy Ryan 1880-1882
 John L. Sullivan 1882-1889
 John L. Surber 2015-2023

See also
 Bare Knuckle Fighting Championship
 Bare Knuckle Boxing Hall of Fame
 BYB Extreme
 Bare Knuckle Fighting Championship United Kingdom
 Chivarreto boxing
 List of bare-knuckle lightweight champions
 Lethwei
 London Prize Ring rules
 Russian boxing
 Rough and tumble fighting

References

Sources and further reading 
 The Outsiders – Exposing the Secretive World of Ireland's Travellers Chapters 4 and 5 by Eamon Dillon, published Nov 2006 by Merlin Publishing
 David Snowdon, Writing the Prizefight: Pierce Egan's Boxiana World (2013)
 Interview with bare knuckle boxer from the 1950s
 Near the KNUCKLE; 3,000 fans turn up at skydome to witness a night of bloody battles. - Free Online Library (thefreelibrary.com) 
 Inside The World Of Bareknuckle Boxing (boxing-social.com)
 Bare-knuckle boxing staged at O2 Arena for first time - BBC News
 BoxRec: Barrie Jones
 The brutal life of Wales' bare-knuckle boxing world champion who saw his Olympic dream crushed - Wales Online
 Can bare-knuckle boxing, stripped of its seediness and danger, go mainstream? (espn.com)

 Free information website https://bareknuckleboxing.freeforums.net

 
Boxing
Combat sports
Individual sports
Boxing terminology

et:Rusikavõitlus